Janisław is a Polish name derived from Jan with a typical Slavic ending of -sław.

The name may refer to:

Janisław I (unknown—1341), Archbishop of Gniezno

Janisław Sipiński (1913—1994), Polish boxer

Janisław Muszyński (1942—2020), Polish businessman and politician

Polish given names